The Meek Mansion is a historic mansion in unincorporated Cherryland, California, just north of Hayward. It is listed on the National Register of Historic Places. Located on nearly 10 acres, the Victorian house was built in 1869 by William Meek.

History
William Meek came to the West Coast in 1846, carrying seeds and grafted trees, via the Oregon Trail. He first settled in the Willamette Valley in Oregon, later moving in 1859 to Alameda County, where he spent the rest of his life.

The grounds were primarily filled with cherry, apricot, plum, and almond orchards. One source claims that the area became known as Cherryland because of the abundance of cherry trees planted by Meek. Meek became a prominent citizen during the remainder of his life, including being a trustee of Mills College and a County Supervisor for Alameda County. After his death in 1880, at the age of 63, Meek left his estate to his sons and it remained in the Meek family until 1940.

The Milton Ream family owned the last 10 acres of the original 3000, and in 1964 the home was purchased for $270,000 by the Hayward Area Recreation and Park District (HARD). In 1965, the home was opened to the public and was used for weddings, tours, workshops, and even plays re-creating local history. The mansion became a California Point of Historical Interest in 1972 and placed on the National Register of Historic Landmarks in 1973. However, the mansion was closed in 1982 due to wear and tear because of overuse. In 1991, HARD began to work with the Hayward Area Historical Society (HAHS) to upgrade and reopen the home.

Between 1964 and 2004, HARD spent $1.9 million in restoring the mansion, its carriage house, and grounds. After decades of review, in 2004 HARD agreed upon a deal to lease the mansion and its accompanying carriage house to the historical society for 25 years. HARD would continue to manage the accompanying acreage of park land surrounding the mansion and would continue to be consulted by the historical society with respect to planning and completing renovations. As of 2009, HAHS was reported to have spent about $600,000 in restorations, some of which involved upgrading the heating and plumbing systems. Completion of the restoration work will require an estimated $1 million to $1.5 million.

Once renovations are completed, the historical society plans on opening the mansion as a house museum where people may take paid tours focusing on the different historical eras the house has gone through.

An adjacent property, formerly part of the Meek estate, is being developed as a community garden.

Architecture

The  mansion contains somewhere between 23 and 27 rooms (sources vary) located on three above-ground levels, with a cupola on the third floor. The home also contains a basement below-ground which has an "unusual" bracing system consisting of thick, diagonally placed timber boards. Having a bracing system such as this was uncommon for many area buildings, but was a wise move due to the faults in the area. Other architectural assets it includes is "a mansard roof, a bull's-eye window in the central tower and paired, arched windows". As of 2006, local historians were still unsure of who designed and built the home.

Throughout the years, the home has undergone several renovations. In 1910, bathrooms and running water were added to the home by Meek's son who resided there. In the 1940s, the Ream family remodeled the kitchen, which is currently still intact in the home, as well as adding bedroom and ballroom space. Recent renovations include all new windows and a new roof to replace the last one that was put in place in 1985.

References

External links

About the Meek Estate - Hayward Area Historical Society
California Office of Historic Preservation Listing

Houses in Alameda County, California
Historic house museums in California
Museums in Alameda County, California
Villas in the United States
Houses completed in 1869
Houses on the National Register of Historic Places in California
National Register of Historic Places in Alameda County, California
Buildings and structures in Hayward, California
Parks in Alameda County, California
Tourist attractions in Alameda County, California
1869 establishments in California
Italianate architecture in California
Second Empire architecture in California
Victorian architecture in California